The 1935 Vanderbilt Commodores football team represented Vanderbilt University as a member of the Southeastern Conference during the 1935 college football season. Led by Ray Morrison, who returned for this second season as head coach after having helmed the team in 1918, the Commodores compiled an overall record of 7–3–1 with a mark of 5–1 in conference play, placing second in the SEC. This remains the best conference record that Vanderbilt has had since joining the SEC. The five SEC wins were not matched until the 2012 team went 5–3.

Vanderbilt played is home games at Dudley Field in Nashville, Tennessee. Team captain was Willie Geny.

Schedule

References

Vanderbilt
Vanderbilt Commodores football seasons
Vanderbilt Commodores football